Shaa'ir and Func (sometimes stylised as "S+F") are an alternative, electronic music duo from Mumbai, composed of Monica Dogra and Randolph Correia, formed in 2007.

Discography

External links
Official website

Indian rock music groups
Musical groups established in 2007